Marcelo Demoliner and Matwé Middelkoop were the reigning champions from when the tournament was last held in 2019, but chose to compete with different partners. Demoliner played alongside Marcus Daniell, but lost in the first round to Ariel Behar and Gonzalo Escobar.

Middelkoop teamed up with Harri Heliövaara to successfully defend the title, defeating Tomislav Brkić and Nikola Ćaćić in the final, 7–5, 4–6, [11–9].

Seeds

Draw

Draw

References

External Links
 Main Draw

Kremlin Cup - Men's Doubles
2021 Doubles